The Wahpeton Hospital on Dakota Avenue in Wahpeton, North Dakota was built in 1911.  It has Classical Revival architecture.

It was listed on the National Register of Historic Places (NRHP) in 1983.

According to its NRHP nomination it is, architecturally, "the finest private building in Wahpeton, surpassed in quality and size only by such
public buildings as the Leach Public Library, Richland County Court House, and Wahpeton city hall."

References

Hospital buildings completed in 1911
Hospital buildings on the National Register of Historic Places in North Dakota
Neoclassical architecture in North Dakota
1911 establishments in North Dakota
National Register of Historic Places in Richland County, North Dakota
Hospital